Montorio may refer to several places:

Italy
Montorio, a hamlet of Monzuno, province of Bologna, Italy
Montorio, Sorano, a village in the province of Grosseto, Italy
Montorio al Vomano, a town in the province of Teramo, Italy
Montorio nei Frentani, a town in the province of Campobasso, Italy
Montorio Romano, a town in the province of Rome, Italy
Montorio Veronese, a town in the province of Verona, Italy

Spain
Montorio, Province of Burgos, a municipality in Castile and León, Spain

See also
Montoro (disambiguation)